John James Perceval, 3rd Earl of Egmont (29 January 1737/38 – 25 February 1822), styled Viscount Perceval from 1748 to 1770, was a British politician.

He was the eldest son of John Perceval, 2nd Earl of Egmont and his first wife Lady Catherine Cecil, and half-brother of Spencer Perceval.

Perceval served as Member of Parliament for Bridgwater from 1762 to 1768. Perceval was also initially declared re-elected in 1768, but on petition, he was judged not to have been duly elected and his opponent, Anne Poulett, was seated in his place. During his period in office, Perceval served in William Pitt the Younger's government.

On 4 December 1770, he succeeded his father as Earl of Egmont and, as his father also held the British peerage of Baron Lovel and Holland, entered the British House of Lords. His father had rebuilt Enmore Castle in Somerset.

He married Isabella (d. 8 September 1821), daughter of Lord Nassau Powlett, on 4 June 1765. They had one son:
John Perceval, 4th Earl of Egmont (1767–1835)

References

External links

1738 births
1822 deaths
Members of the Parliament of Great Britain for English constituencies
Tory MPs (pre-1834)
British MPs 1761–1768
Earls of Egmont